Streatham is a constituency represented in the House of Commons of the UK Parliament since 2019 by Bell Ribeiro-Addy of the Labour Party.

In the 2016 EU referendum, Streatham was estimated to have voted to remain in the European Union by 79%. This was the second highest remain vote in the United Kingdom, behind Vauxhall.

Boundaries

1918–1974: The Metropolitan Borough of Wandsworth ward of Streatham.

1974–1983: The London Borough of Lambeth wards of Clapham Park, St Leonard's, Streatham Hill, Streatham South, Streatham Wells, and Thornton.

1983–1997: As above plus Town Hall ward.

1997–2010: As above plus St Martin's and Tulse Hill wards.

2010–present: The London Borough of Lambeth wards of Brixton Hill, Clapham Common, St Leonard's, Streatham Hill, Streatham South, Streatham Wells, Thornton, and Tulse Hill.

Streatham is a long constituency comprising the south-west portion of the London Borough of Lambeth. The town of Streatham constitutes the four wards in the southern half of the constituency. At its north-western tip the seat includes half of Clapham Common; the north-east takes in part of Brixton which is shared with neighbouring Vauxhall and Dulwich and West Norwood.

The northern boundary follows Clapham Park Road, Acre Lane, and Coldharbour Lane through Clapham and Brixton to Lambeth Town Hall. The north-eastern boundary generally follows Effra Road and Tulse Hill, but runs east of the main road to include the part of the Tulse Hill estate and the Cressingham Gardens estate west of Brockwell Park.  The boundary skirts the Tulse Hill district centre, following Hardel Rise, Christchurch Road and Norwood Road, and then runs along Leigham Vale and Leigham Court Road. The southern and western constituency boundaries follow Lambeth's borough boundaries with Croydon, Merton and Wandsworth.

History

Local government results
The local government wards in the constituency are currently represented by 20 Labour councillors, 1 Conservative councillor and 3 Green councillors, including Jonathan Bartley, the leader of the opposition on Lambeth Council, and former London MEP Scott Ainslie.

Nine Liberal Democrat councillors represented the wards of Streatham Hill, Streatham Wells and St Leonard's, with one additional councillor elected at Clapham Common in 2010. All Streatham wards had been represented by the Liberal Democrats from 1990 to 2014 before Labour subsequently gained seven seats from them at the 2014 council elections. The Liberal Democrats were unsuccessful in gaining any seats back at the 2018 local elections. In a 2019 Thornton Ward by-election, the Lib Dems came within 19 votes of winning the seat.

In 2018, the Conservatives held one seat and lost two to Labour in Clapham Common by a very narrow margin, whilst the Greens took the other two seats from Labour in St Leonard's.

Political history
Streatham was for a few decades solidly Tory suburbia overall: the Conservatives won Streatham when Labour gained large majorities in 1945 and 1966, and it was the only seat in the former LCC area (Inner London) apart from the Chelsea/Kensington/Westminster/City central core to remain consistently Conservative.  More recently, demographic and voting pattern changes combined with unfavourable boundary changes converted Streatham into a marginal seat, then into a mid-ranking safe Labour seat.

Streatham has modestly swung against the Conservative Party since the 1980s, even more than other similar seats in South London (such as Croydon North, Dulwich and West Norwood, Lewisham East and West).

The Conservative Party lost Streatham in 1992, having held it since 1918. The Conservative candidate was beaten into third place by a Liberal Democrat in 2001, and there were swings from Labour to the Liberal Democrats at the two subsequent general elections. In 2010, when the Labour incumbent, Keith Hill, retired and Chuka Umunna stood for the party, there was a serious Liberal Democrat campaign resulting in their best showing to date in the seat, but there was also a marginal increase in the Conservative vote share and Umunna was elected.  The 2015 result was the re-election of Umunna, which made the seat the 96th safest of Labour's 232 seats by percentage of majority.

In 2015 the Conservatives moved into second place with a sharp increase in numerical vote share, and remained there in 2017.  However, in 2019, they reverted to third place behind the Liberal Democrats.

Historic boundaries
The constituency of Streatham was contested under this name at the 1918 general election, when it approximately followed the historic parish boundaries of Streatham, including a substantial part of Balham, a 19th-century founded and primarily urban parish by that time.

The constituency was carved out of the former constituency of Wandsworth in the same way as Putney, Wandsworth Central and Balham and Tooting under the Representation of the People Act 1918, the fourth major UK reform, that settled upon single member constituencies, and roughly equal electorates.

The 1918 boundaries remained unchanged until the 1965 changes to Greater London local government became reflected in the parliamentary constituencies, at the February 1974 general election.  This resulted in a net reduction in the size of the area. The western district Streatham Park (location of the Streatham Conservative Club) and the remainder of Furzedown ward went into the Tooting seat.

The rest of the constituency, including the town of Streatham has since 1965 been in the London Borough of Lambeth. Three other constituencies covered Lambeth from 1974, Vauxhall, Norwood and Lambeth Central. The Clapham constituency was abolished as part of the 1974 changes. The Clapham Park area and Hyde Farm (commonly thought of as part of Balham) came into the Streatham seat, whereas the rest of Clapham went into the Vauxhall seat creating an enduring split.

On abolition of Lambeth Central at the 1983 election, the constituency gained much of southern Brixton. Following further population decline, Lambeth was paired with Southwark in the next boundary review, and from the 1997 election, Streatham constituency gained areas around Tulse Hill from the former Norwood constituency, the rest of which became part of Dulwich and West Norwood.

2016 European Union Referendum

In the 2016 referendum on European Union membership, Streatham is estimated to have posted the highest proportion of support for Remain of any constituency, at 79.5%.

Constituency profile
Among the most ethnically diverse constituencies, Streatham - which covers parts of Clapham, Brixton, Tulse Hill and Streatham itself - is in the south London borough of Lambeth. Only 58.2% of residents are white and it has among the most mixed race and black residents in the country, according to the 2011 Census. It also has Polish, Portuguese and Hispanic communities.

The bulk of residents are aged 25–44, with relatively few pensioners. Although it is a residential area, it is more popular with young workers than families, having good transport links into central London. Many residents rent, and there is a large social housing sector. Commercially, Streatham High Road is home to over 400 businesses, whilst a £26m ice rink and leisure centre opened in November 2013, part of continuing investment. The population is highly qualified and a high percentage are in full-time work.

At just over 6% of the population, Streatham, (which is located in the London Borough of Lambeth) has the largest proportion of LGBT+ people in the country.

Members of Parliament

Elections

Elections in the 2010s
17% was the largest vote share increase in a Labour held seat for the Liberal Democrats at the 2019 general election.

 

NB Percentage comparisons in the table above are against the notional result on the new constituency boundaries.

Elections in the 2000s

Elections in the 1990s

Elections in the 1980s

Elections in the 1970s

Elections in the 1960s

Elections in the 1950s

Elections in the 1940s

Elections in the 1930s

Elections in the 1920s

Elections in the 1910s

See also
List of parliamentary constituencies in London

Notes

References

Sources

External links 
Politics Resources (Election results from 1922 onwards)
Electoral Calculus (Election results from 1955 onwards)

Parliamentary constituencies in London
Politics of the London Borough of Lambeth
Constituencies of the Parliament of the United Kingdom established in 1918
Streatham